"Aquamarine no Mama de Ite" (Japanese: アクアマリンのままでいて, lit. Stay Aquamarine) is the second single by Carlos Toshiki & Omega Tribe, released by VAP on August 10, 1988. The single peaked at #3 on the Oricon charts. The single is widely recognized as a signature song for Omega Tribe, especially after the name change from "1986 Omega Tribe" to "Carlos Toshiki & Omega Tribe." It is also known as a signature song for Carlos Toshiki's time as the lead vocalist alongside the single "Kimi wa 1000%."

Soundtrack appearances 
The song was used as the theme song for the 1980 Fuji TV drama Dakishimetai! and its sequels Dakishimetai! '89, Dakishimetai! '90, and Dakishimetai! Seikimatsu Special.
The chorus of the song was used in the song "Shitsuren Suru Tame no 500 no Manual." Both songs were included in the album Be Yourself.
In 2000, when Carlos Toshiki made an emergency trip to Japan to be on the Nippon TV program, "Anohitohaima!?," he sang "Kimi wa 1000%" and "Aquamarine no Mama de Ite" on the program.
The song made an appearance in Masterpieces ～PURE GOLD POPS～ Masao Urino Sakuhin-shū “Tengoku Yori Yaban”, released on December 21, 2016 to commemorate the 35th anniversary of the lyricist  of the song, Masao Urino.

Charts

Weekly charts

Year-end charts

Cover versions

Every Little Thing version 

The pop/soft rock duo  Every Little Thing recorded a cover version of the song for their album Fun-Fare. The cover was produced by Yasuharu Konishi and used as the theme song of the Fuji TV drama Dakishimetai! Forever, a sequel to the original Dakishimetai! drama. The single was given a limitted release by Avex Trax on August 24, 2013, and was released in the album Fun-Fare on February 19, 2014.

Hitomitoi version 
A cover version was recorded by Hitomitoi for the album Twilight Time, released on October 29, 2014.

Paris Match version 
The musical group Paris Match covered the song as a part of the album Manatsu no Inosensu Sakushi-ka Urino Masao Hits Covers, a collection of songs .in commemoration of the 35th anniversary of Masao Urino, who wrote the single.

References 

1988 songs
1988 singles
2013 singles
Every Little Thing (band) songs
Omega Tribe (Japanese band) songs